This is a list of episodes from the third season of Shark Tank.

Episodes

Mark Cuban, Daymond John, Kevin O'Leary and Robert Herjavec appear as sharks in every episode this season. Barbara Corcoran appears in 11 episodes and Lori Greiner appears in 4 episodes.

References

External links 
 Official website
 

3
2012 American television seasons